Lomia (minor planet designation: 117 Lomia) is a large main-belt asteroid that has a nearly circular orbit; the orbital eccentricity is 0.029. It was discovered by French astronomer Alphonse Borrelly on September 12, 1871, from the Marseilles Observatory. The preliminary orbital elements were published in the following year by German astronomer Friedrich Tietjen. The reason for the name is uncertain, but Lutz D. Schmadel believes it is most likely a misspelling of Lamia, the female demon of Greek mythology (the asteroid 248 Lameia is also named after this figure).

The curve is symmetrical with a single maxima and minima. This object has a spectrum that matches an XC classification; occupying the transition range between an X-type and a C-type asteroid. It has an estimated cross-section diameter of ~148 km.

Eight occultations of stars by Lomia have so far been observed, between 2000 and 2018. Four of these events provided two or more chords across the asteroid, including a four-chord event in 2003.

References

External links 
 
 

000117
000117
000117
Discoveries by Alphonse Borrelly
Named minor planets
000117
18710912